Trox unistriatus is a beetle of the Family Trogidae.

References 

unistriatus
Beetles described in 1818